The 1987 All-Ireland Under-21 Football Championship was the 24th staging of the All-Ireland Under-21 Football Championship since its establishment by the Gaelic Athletic Association in 1964.

Cork entered the championship as defending champions; however, they were defeated by Tipperary in the Munster semi-final.

On 28 June 1987, Donegal won the championship following a 1–12 to 2–4 defeat of Kerry in an All-Ireland final replay. This was their second All-Ireland title overall and their first in five championship seasons; the following players won the Sam Maguire Cup with their county in 1992: Manus Boyle, John Cunningham, John Joe Doherty, Barry McGowan and Tommy Ryan; Boyle scored 1–7 in the final; Sean Bonner (brother of Declan) was in the full-back line; the losing Kerry team featured Mick Galwey, who scored a goal.

Results

All-Ireland Under-21 Football Championship

Semi-finals

Finals

Statistics

Miscellaneous
 The All-Ireland final ended in a draw for the fifth time in the history of the championship.

References

1987
All-Ireland Under-21 Football Championship